This is a list of breath mint brands in alphabetical order. A breath mint is a type of candy primarily consumed to freshen the smell of one's breath, by masking offensive odors with the scent of mint or other flavoring, and by stimulating the flow of saliva to help remove food and bacterial debris from the mouth. Like chewing gums and throat lozenges, many breath mints are artificially sweetened and consumed solely for non-nutritive purposes.

Breath mint brands

See also

 List of chewing gum brands
 List of confectionery brands
 Cough drops, also known as throat lozenges
 Mint
 Spearmint
 Peppermint
 Wintergreen
 Candy cane
 Humbug

References

 
Breath mints
 
Breath mints